Baron Profumo was a title in the nobility of the Kingdom of Sardinia. It was created by Charles Albert, King of Sardinia, on 30 November 1843 for Antonio Profumo, a Genoese merchant and politician who was President of the Tribunal of Commerce in Genoa. The best known Baron Profumo was the British politician John Profumo, who did not use the title. Italian noble titles were no longer recognised in Italy after 1948.

Barons Profumo
, 1st Baron Profumo (1788–1852)
Pietro Profumo, 2nd Baron Profumo, principal secretary to Count Cavour (d. 1867)
Joseph Alexander Profumo, 3rd Baron Profumo (1849–1911)
Alberto Pier Anthony Profumo, 4th Baron Profumo, barrister (1879–1940)
John Dennis Profumo, 5th Baron Profumo, British politician known for the Profumo affair (1915–2006)
David John Profumo, 6th Baron Profumo, FRSL, is an English novelist (born 20 October 1955).

See also
Nobility of Italy

References

Profumo
Families of Genoa
Noble titles created in 1843